Titiwangsa Lake Park is an urban park in Titiwangsa, Kuala Lumpur, Malaysia.

History
The gardens feature a large central lake that was a byproduct of tin mining activities under British Rule. Later on, the area was cleaned up and developed into a park. The name Titiwangsa was chosen because Titiwangsa is a mountain range that forms the backbone of Peninsular Malaysia. Before that, the park was named after Taman Jalan Kuantan. The name felt appropriate because the view of the park's flat land and its greenery reflected the scenery and climate of the mountain range.

Architecture

The lake garden has facilities such as a jogging track, cycling track, kayaking, horse riding facility, radio-controlled car racing track etc.

Transport
The lake garden is accessible within walking distance north east of Titiwangsa Station.

See also
 List of tourist attractions in Kuala Lumpur
 Mining in Malaysia

References

External links

 Titiwangsa Park Lake gardens activities pricing and other information

Year of establishment missing
Gardens in Malaysia
Parks in Kuala Lumpur
Lakes of Malaysia